Binod Hazarika is an Indian politician and a Bharatiya Janata Party politician from Assam. He was elected in 2016 Assam Legislative Assembly election from Chabua.

In protests against the Citizenship (Amendment) Act, 2019 in December 2019 a group of demonstrators set fire to his house.

In May 2021 he was elected as MLA for Lahowal.

References 

Living people
Bharatiya Janata Party politicians from Assam
Assam MLAs 2016–2021
People from Lakhimpur district
Year of birth missing (living people)
Assam MLAs 2021–2026